Courtney Winfield-Hill (born 9 January 1987) is an Australian born sportswoman who formerly played  rugby league for  and Leeds Rhinos. Originally Winfield-Hill played cricket as a pace bowler for Queensland Fire and Brisbane Heat, before moving sports and countries to play rugby league.

Sporting career
Nicknamed "Corker" because her younger sister had difficulty pronouncing her name as a toddler, Winfield-Hill was born in Maryborough, Queensland.  She was raised in Monto, Queensland, and in Rockhampton, where she also learned to play cricket.  In November 2009, Winfield-Hill made her debut for Queensland Fire.  In 2011, she moved to the Sunshine Coast to pursue a career in professional cricket.

Injury prevented Winfield-Hill from having much of an impact on the 2011–12 Women's National Cricket League season.  The following summer, she had limited opportunities due to competition from other pace bowlers, but still played five of the eight WNCL matches and nine of the 12 T20s.  In 2013–14, she enjoyed more success, taking wickets in both series at averages of 29.33 and 18.42 respectively.

Winfield-Hill was a member of the Brisbane Heat squad since its inaugural WBBL01 season (2015–16).

A schoolteacher by profession, Winfield-Hill worked at St Ursula's College, Yeppoon, while living in Rockhampton, and as of 2015 was the Year 10 co-ordinator at Unity College, Caloundra.  In 2014, she took up professional sprinting, and, in her debut performance, won the 100m Ladies Gift at the 33rd annual Ipswich Winter Carnival.  In 2015, she competed in Australia's premiere handicap sprint, the Stawell Gift.

In April 2018 she made the decision to join her then partner (now wife), Lauren Winfield, in England and on arrival took the decision to change sports to rugby league - a game she had not played since junior level. Despite this lack of experience she was given a contract by Leeds Rhinos Women and was an integral member of the Leeds squad that won the 2018 Challenge Cup and the League Leaders Shield in the 2018 Women's Super League.

Hill succeeded Lois Forsell as captain of the Rhinos for the 2019 season and was named as the 2019 Telegraph Woman of Steel at the Super League end of season awards on 6 October 2019.

In February 2020 Winfield-Hill signed a short term contract to play for Sydney Roosters in the 2020 NRL Nines before rejoining the  Rhinos for the 2020 Women's Super League.

At the start of the 2022 Winfield-Hill was named in the  35-strong performance squad ahead of the World Cup. Winfield-Hill qualifies to play for England under residency rules.

During the World Cup, Winfield-Hill appeared in all four of England's matches ending with the semi-final defeat to New Zealand.  After the defeat Winfield-Hill announced her retirement from playing rugby league.

Personal life
In March 2020, Winfield-Hill married England cricketer Lauren Winfield-Hill.

Winfield-Hill also works as the Head Academy Coach for the Northern Diamonds cricket team.

See also

List of cricket and rugby league players

References

External links

1987 births
Living people
21st-century Australian LGBT people
Australian female rugby league players
Australian women cricketers
Australian expatriate sportspeople in England
Brisbane Heat (WBBL) cricketers
Cricketers from Queensland
England women's national rugby league team players
Leeds Rhinos Women players
Australian LGBT sportspeople
LGBT cricketers
Queensland Fire cricketers
Rugby league players from Maryborough, Queensland
Rugby league halfbacks
Sportswomen from Queensland